Thomas Jones was a college football player. He was a prominent end for coach Bill Alexander's Georgia Tech Yellow Jackets from 1928 to 1930. After a year on the freshman team in 1927, Jones played for the national champion 1928 Golden Tornado. Jones alternate-captain of the 1930 team. George Trevor once selected him for an all-time Tech team.

References

American football ends
All-Southern college football players
Georgia Tech Yellow Jackets football players